The central lar gibbon (Hylobates lar entelloides) is  is an subspecies of white-handed or lar gibbon that is vulnerable to extinction. It is endemic to Malaysia, Myanmar, and Thailand.

References 

Mammals of Malaysia
Mammals of Myanmar
Mammals of Thailand
Mammals described in 1842
Taxa named by Isidore Geoffroy Saint-Hilaire